McLaren Park is a suburb of West Auckland, New Zealand. It is named after New Zealand Formula One driver and founder of the McLaren Formula One Team Bruce McLaren. The local State secondary schools are Henderson High School, Rutherford College, St Dominic's College and Liston College.

Demographics

McLaren Park had a population of 4,350 at the 2018 New Zealand census, an increase of 267 people (6.5%) since the 2013 census, and an increase of 456 people (11.7%) since the 2006 census. There were 1,230 households, comprising 2,115 males and 2,238 females, giving a sex ratio of 0.95 males per female. The median age was 31.2 years (compared with 37.4 years nationally), with 1,062 people (24.4%) aged under 15 years, 1,014 (23.3%) aged 15 to 29, 1,878 (43.2%) aged 30 to 64, and 399 (9.2%) aged 65 or older.

Ethnicities were 44.6% European/Pākehā, 17.4% Māori, 32.7% Pacific peoples, 22.1% Asian, and 3.6% other ethnicities. People may identify with more than one ethnicity.

The percentage of people born overseas was 36.9, compared with 27.1% nationally.

Although some people chose not to answer the census's question about religious affiliation, 36.3% had no religion, 45.7% were Christian, 1.2% had Māori religious beliefs, 4.0% were Hindu, 2.9% were Muslim, 1.9% were Buddhist and 2.3% had other religions.

Of those at least 15 years old, 516 (15.7%) people had a bachelor's or higher degree, and 684 (20.8%) people had no formal qualifications. The median income was $28,300, compared with $31,800 nationally. 306 people (9.3%) earned over $70,000 compared to 17.2% nationally. The employment status of those at least 15 was that 1,656 (50.4%) people were employed full-time, 390 (11.9%) were part-time, and 192 (5.8%) were unemployed.

Education
Bruce McLaren Intermediate is an intermediate (years 7-8) school with a roll of  students.

Waitakere Seventh-day Adventist School is a full primary (years 1-8) school with a roll of  students.

Both schools are coeducational.

References

Suburbs of Auckland
Henderson-Massey Local Board Area
West Auckland, New Zealand